Yves Goasdoué (born 22 August 1959) is a French politician. He is the mayor of Flers, Normandy since 2001. He also sat in the National Assembly between 2012 and 2017. He is of Breton origin.

In 1998, he was elected regional councillor for the Orne, and successively mayor of Flers in 2001.

References

1959 births
Living people
French people of Breton descent
People from Cherbourg-Octeville
Socialist Party (France) politicians
Deputies of the 14th National Assembly of the French Fifth Republic
Mayors of places in Normandy
Members of Parliament for Orne